Birkenhead Transport Limited was a bus fleet operator based in the suburb of Birkdale, near Birkenhead on the North Shore of Auckland, New Zealand. In common with other Auckland bus fleet operators, it was contracted to Auckland Transport (AT), an Auckland Council entity. The services it runs are on timetabled suburban AT Metro routes.

As of April 2018, Birkenhead Transport employed 110 driversr The company ran no scheduled inter-city services. Its buses were for hire.

Birkenhead Transport was sold to Ritchies Transport Holdings in May 2019.

History
The company was founded in 1933 by Charles W. Inwards, who had arrived in New Zealand from England in 1919. It is being managed by the third and fourth generations of the Inwards family.

See also 
 Public transport in Auckland

References

External links
Company website

Bus companies of New Zealand
Transport companies established in 1933
New Zealand companies established in 1933